
Sierpc County is a unit of territorial administration and local government (powiat) in Masovian Voivodeship, east-central Poland. It came into being on 1 January 1999 as a result of the Polish local government reforms passed in 1998.

As of 2019 its total population is 52,077, out of which the population of Sierpc is 17,994, and the rural population is 34,083.

Neighbouring counties
Sierpc County is bordered by Żuromin County to the north-east, Płońsk County to the east, Płock County to the south, Lipno County to the west and Rypin County to the north-west.

Administrative division
The county is subdivided into seven gminas (one urban and six rural). These are listed in the following table, in descending order of population.

References

 
Sierpc